Angus Wilson Lennie (18 April 1930 – 14 September 2014) was a Scottish film and theatre character actor with a 50-year career span. His numerous credits include the character of Flying Officer Archibald Ives in The Great Escape, and Shughie McFee in the television soap opera Crossroads.

Early life
Lennie was born and raised in Glasgow, receiving formal education there at Eastbank Academy. During his childhood he was a member of the 94th Glasgow (1st Shettleston) Company of Scotland's Boys' Brigade.

He started his career in show business at the age of 14 whilst engaged in an apprenticeship as a stockbroker's clerk, and appeared whilst still a teenager in song and dance acts at the Glasgow Metropole, his diminutive size at 5 ft 1" aiding his nimbleness in performance. After briefly trying stand-up comedy on Scotland's variety circuit post-World War II, and service with Her Majesty's Armed Forces as a National Serviceman, after a period performing in song and dance, and comedy routines, in the English seaside towns along the South-East coast, he decided to become an actor, and took up a trainee position with the Perth Repertory Company in his early twenties, and went on to work with repertory companies in Oxford and Birmingham.

Television
He remains well known for his long running role as cook Shughie McFee in the soap opera Crossroads, which he played from 1974 to 1981. Angus Lennie left the show without his character being formally written out. This ignominy led to characters in soap operas disappearing without explanation being classed as, "in the kitchen with Shughie McFee." 
His earliest major role was as Davie "Sunny Jim" Green in BBC Scotland's  comedy series, Para Handy - Master Mariner in 1959–60. Other TV credits include: Target Luna, The Saint (The Fellow Traveller), Doctor Who (in the serials The Ice Warriors and Terror of the Zygons), The Borderers, Z-Cars, Rumpole of the Bailey, Lovejoy, The Onedin Line, All Night Long, Keeping Up Appearances and Monarch of the Glen.

Film
Lennie's first role in cinema was in Tunes of Glory (1960), and he went on to establish a successful career in the medium as a character actor, often playing plucky wee Scotsman parts in war films such as The Great Escape (1963), 633 Squadron (1964), and Oh! What a Lovely War (1969). He was also in a succession of comedies such as Petticoat Pirates (1961), Operation Snatch (1962) and One of Our Dinosaurs Is Missing (1975). He also appeared alongside Richard Burton in the film The V.I.P.s in 1964.

Stage
He appeared in many stage productions, including A Midsummer Night's Dream and pantomimes.

Death
Lennie died on 14 September 2014 in Acton, West London, aged 84.

Filmography

References

External links
 

1930 births
2014 deaths
Male actors from Glasgow
Scottish male film actors
Scottish male soap opera actors
Scottish male stage actors
Scottish male television actors
People educated at Eastbank Academy